Mim Suleiman is a singer, songwriter, composer, performer, workshop facilitator and campaigner from Zanzibar. She now resides in Sheffield, England.

Biography 
Suleiman moved to the UK from Zanzibar in the 1980s, teaching metallurgy at the University of Birmingham before turning her career to music. As she states, "what was once as a person of no art has become now an artist within fifteen years...it's given me a depth of life I've never had before". Her music encompasses elements from afro-beat, electronic, disco, deep house, and soul. She mainly sings in her native language Swahili, but occasionally uses other languages such as English and Fulani.

She is best known for her track Mingi, which features on Soulwax FM in the Grand Theft Auto V soundtrack.

Discography

Albums 
 Tungi (BubbleTease Communications, 2010)
 Umbeya (BubbleTease Communications, 2012)
 Adera Dera (BubbleTease Communications, 2015)
 Kawaida (BubbleTease Communications, 2017)
 Si Bure (BubbleTease Communications, 2019)

Singles and EPs 
 Mingi (Running Back, 2010)
 Nyuli (Running Back, 2010)

References 

Living people
21st-century Tanzanian women singers
Year of birth missing (living people)